is a Japanese original short anime television series about ASMR co-animated by Ekachi Epilka and Indivision and directed by Yoshinobu Kasai. Original character designs are provided by cura, while Yoshinori Ōtsuka adapts the designs for animation. The series aired from October to December 2022 on Tokyo MX. The anime's theme song is "Katachi ni Dekinai Monologue" by Kotoko.

Characters

Episode list

References

External links
Anime official website 

Anime with original screenplays
Autonomous sensory meridian response
Comedy anime and manga
Ekachi Epilka
Fiction about reincarnation
Tokyo MX original programming
Yuri (genre) anime and manga